William Bradford (April 30, 1823 – April 25, 1892) was an American romanticist painter, photographer and explorer, originally from Fairhaven, Massachusetts, near New Bedford.  His early work focused on portraits of the many ships in New Bedford Harbor.  In 1858, his painting New Bedford Harbor at Sunset was included in Albert Bierstadt's landmark New Bedford Art Exhibition.

Career

He is known for his paintings of ships and Arctic seascapes. From 1861 to 1866 he made excursions north to Labrador with Dr. Isaac Israel Hayes. He was one of the first American painters to portray the frozen regions of the north: for example, his contemporary Frederic Edwin Church had painted The Icebergs in 1861; Albert Bierstadt was also active in the same period. Bradford was accompanied by photographer William H. Pierce on his 1864 expedition, which resulted in the first iceberg photographs taken in acrtic regions.

In 1862, Boston, he was an art teacher to Charles Dormon Robinson. 
                                                          
With funds provided by LeGrand Lockwood, Bradford traveled to Greenland in 1869, his farthest northern excursion, reaching eventually as far as 75° north latitude aboard the steamship Panther, accompanied by photographers John L. Dunmore and George Critcherson. Upon his return, Bradford spent two years in London, where he published an account of his trips to the north, entitled The Arctic regions, illustrated with photographs taken on an art expedition to Greenland; with descriptive narrative by the artist.(London, 1873)  In 1874, he was elected into the National Academy of Design as an Associate member.

He was associated with the Hudson River School, not an institution but rather an informal group of like-minded painters.  He adopted their techniques and became highly interested in the way light touches water and how it affects the appearance of water surfaces and the general atmospherics of a painting. He compositionally balanced many of his paintings by creating a counter-subject and by placing darker colors around the edges, framing and counteracting the center's better-lit subject.

Gallery

References

External links

 http://www.whalingmuseum.org/online_exhibits/wm_bradford/index.html
 Biography at the Dictionary of Canadian Biography Online
 www.William-Bradford-Gallery.org 123 works by William Bradford
 Sterling and Francine Clark Art Institute 2002 exhibition "Arctic Diary: Paintings and Photographs by William Bradford"
 New Bedford Whaling Museum 2003 exhibition "William Bradford: Sailing Ships & Arctic Seas"
 "Arctic Visions: Away then Floats the Ice-Island", exhibit microsite

1823 births
1892 deaths
19th-century American painters
American male painters
American explorers
19th-century American photographers
American marine artists
People from Fairhaven, Massachusetts
19th-century American male artists